Ignaz Auer (19 April 1846 – 10 April 1907) was a Bavarian Social Democratic politician who served as a member of the German Reichstag for the Glauchau-Meerane Reichstag constituency intermittently between 1884 and 1906. He was born in Dommelstadl in 1846, the son of a butcher, and joined the Social Democratic Workers' Party in 1866. In 1872, he moved to Berlin as a saddler, where he met and became friends with Eduard Bernstein, later an influential Marxist theoretician. He was an active participant in the unity congress of 1875 at Gotha, which founded the Social Democratic Party of Germany, (SPD) and later became Party Secretary of the SPD. Though on the right of the party, Auer was a pragmatist and viewed attempts to formulate social democratic reformism theoretically as harmful to its real political practice. He remarked to Bernstein during the controversy over the latter's theory of revisionism, "What you call for, my dear Ede, is something which one neither admits openly nor puts to a formal vote; one simply gets on with it." Auer died in Berlin on 10 April 1907.

References

Sources

1846 births
1907 deaths
Social Democratic Party of Germany politicians
Members of the 6th Reichstag of the German Empire
Members of the 8th Reichstag of the German Empire
Members of the 9th Reichstag of the German Empire
Members of the 10th Reichstag of the German Empire
Members of the 11th Reichstag of the German Empire
Members of the 12th Reichstag of the German Empire
German trade unionists
People from Passau (district)
People from the Kingdom of Bavaria